Jaime Manuel Gomez (born June 27, 1972 in Laredo, Texas) is an American-born Mexican professional boxer in the Light Middleweight division.

Pro career

IBF lightweight Championship
In July 2000, Jaime Manuel lost to IBF Lightweight Champion Shane Mosley.

His biggest win was an upset knockout of undefeated African Kofi Jantuah. He would then go to have a draw against Mexican Jesus Soto Karass.

WBO Welterweight Championship
On February 18, 2006 Gomez lost to the Antonio Margarito in Las Vegas, Nevada.

References

External links

Boxers from Texas
People from Tamaulipas
Light-middleweight boxers
Welterweight boxers
1972 births
Living people
People from Laredo, Texas
American male boxers
American boxers of Mexican descent